Emerald Ignacio aka "DriftGirl" (born October 28, 1980 in Seattle, Washington) is an
actor and model, who started out building and racing import type cars.

The cars she's built have been featured in some of the best tuning magazines as well as a full featured article in MAXIM magazine called: "Emerald Ignacio: Danika Patricks match on and off the road" in May 2006

The MTV show called "Fast Inc." followed her and documented one of her photoshoots and was hired to source a car for the pictorial.

She can be seen briefly in The Fast and the Furious: Tokyo Drift as well as driving in a featured car that she built.

References

External links
 http://www.MySpace.com/DriftGirl
 Talent profile of Emerald Ignacio on SlateCast.com

1980 births
Living people
Female models from Washington (state)
21st-century American women